This list of hospitals in Indianapolis includes more than 20 existing and ten former hospitals located in Indianapolis, Indiana, United States. Most of the city's medical facilities belong to three private, non-profit healthcare systems: Ascension St. Vincent Health, Community Health Network, and Indiana University Health. Several of the city's hospitals are teaching hospitals affiliated with the Indiana University School of Medicine and its academic medical center at IUPUI, or with the Marian University College of Osteopathic Medicine. Eskenazi Health's flagship Sidney & Lois Eskenazi Hospital serves as the city's public safety net hospital.

Current hospitals

Closed hospitals

Central State Hospital (1848–1994)
Deaconess Hospital and Clinic (1895–1935)
Eleanor Hospital (1895–1909)
Marion County Healthcare Center (1832–1996)
Norways Sanatorium (1898–1957)
Robert W. Long Hospital (1914–1970)
Sunnyside Sanatorium (1917–1969)
Westview Hospital (1975–2016)
William H. Coleman Hospital for Women (1927–1974)
Winona Memorial Hospital (1956–2004)

See also
List of hospitals in Indiana

Notes

References

Healthcare in Indianapolis

Hospitals in Indianapolis
Indianapolis
Indiana, Indianapolis